Whistling green pigeon has been split into the following species:

 Ryukyu green pigeon, Treron permagnus, endemic to Japan
 Taiwan green pigeon, Treron formosae, found in Taiwan and Bahanes

Birds by common name